The 1968 Chico State Wildcats football team represented Chico State College—now known as California State University, Chico—as a member of the Far Western Conference (FWC) during the 1968 NCAA College Division football season. Led by second-year head coach Pete Riehlman, Chico State compiled an overall record of 5–5 with a mark of 2–4 in conference play, placing fifth in the FWC. The team was outscored by its opponents 206 to 149 for the season. The Wildcats played home games at College Field in Chico, California.

Schedule

References

Chico State
Chico State Wildcats football seasons
Chico State Wildcats football